Sigrid  is a Scandinavian given name for women from Old Norse Sigríðr,
composed of the elements sigr "victory" and fríðr "beautiful". 
Common short forms include Siri, Sigga, Sig, and Sigi. An Estonian and Finnish variant is Siiri. The Latvian version of the name is Zigrīda.

People 
 Sigrid (singer), Norwegian singer
 Princess Sigrid of Sweden, Swedish princess
 Sigrid Alegría, Chilean actress
 Sigrid Alexandersen (born 1995), Norwegian orienteer 
 Sigrid Agren, French fashion model
 Sigrid Banér, Swedish letter writer
 Sigrid Björkegren (1845 – 1936), Swedish entrepreneur
 Sigrid Borge (born 1995), Norwegian javelin thrower
 Sigrid Brahe, Swedish countess
 Sigrid Brattabø Handegard (born 1963), Norwegian politician 
 Sigrid D. Peyerimhoff, a German chemist
 Sigrid Elmblad (1860 – 1926), a Swedish journalist and poet
 Sigrid Eskilsdotter (Banér), a Swedish noble
 Sigrid Fick, a Swedish tennis player
 Sigrid af Forselles (1860—1935), Finnish sculptor
 Sigrid Fry-Revere, American bioethicist
 Sigrid Gurie, Norwegian-American actress
 Sigrid the Haughty, Swedish, possibly Slavic, queen of Sweden, Denmark, and England
 Sigrid Helliesen Lund (1892–1987), Norwegian peace activist
 Sigrid Hjertén, Swedish painter
 Sigrid Hjørnegård (born 1965), Norwegian politician 
 Sigrid Holmquist, Swedish actress
 Sigrid Holmwood, British artist
 Sigrid Hunke, German author
 Sigrid Huun (born 1952), Norwegian actress
 Sigrid Kaag, Dutch diplomat and politician
 Sigrid Kirchmann, Austrian high jumper
 Sigrid Kruse (1867–1950), Swedish educator, children's writer and suffragist
 Sigrid Lidströmer, Swedish novelist
 Sigrid Moldestad (born 1972), Norwegian folk singer and musician 
 Sigrid Nunez, American novelist
 Sigrid Sepp, Estonian swimmer
 Sigrid Schultz, American war correspondent
 Sigrid Sparre, Swedish lady-in-waiting
 Sigrid Stray (1893–1978), Norwegian barrister and women's rights proponent
 Sigrid Sture, Swedish governor
 Sigrid Thornton, Australian actress
 Sigrid Bonde Tusvik (born 1980), Norwegian television presenter and entertainer
 Sigrid Undset, Norwegian novelist and Nobel Prize winner
 Sigrid Valdis, American actress
 Sigrid Wille, German skier
 Sigrid Wolf, Austrian skier

See also 
 1493 Sigrid, an asteroid
 Sigríður
 Siri (software)

References

External links
 
 "Sigrid", BehindTheName.com.

Scandinavian feminine given names
Swedish feminine given names
German feminine given names
Norwegian feminine given names
Old Norse personal names